Danchhi is a village and former Village Development Committee that is now part of Kageshwari-Manohara Municipality in Kathmandu District in Province No. 3 of central Nepal. At the time of the 2011 Nepal census, it had a population of 11,246 and had 2,593 households in it. Danchhi is now included in Kageswori Manohara Municipality. 
Danchhi/Thali is bounded by Bagmati and Manohara river. The major places include Thali/थली, Nayapati, Bhadrawas, Hariyalinagar, Dumakhal, and Gajarkot. The major government schools are Shree Sahid Aadarsha Uchha MaVi, Shree Kanti Bhairab MaVi, and Shree Chaulanarayan PraVi. Private schools include Miniland English High School, Mount Everest Secondary School, Pragya Sadan School, Alpine Academy, and Hindu Vidhya Peeth.

In recent local election Krishna Hari Thapa was elected as the Mayor of the Municipality. He garnered 8,969 votes. He edged Nepali Congress’ Upendra Karki by 482 vote margin. Likwise, UML Bindu Simkhada was elected to the pose to deputy mayor of the same municipality. She received 9,182 votes. Meanwhile, UML clinched victory in ward number 1, 3, 5, 6, 8 and 9 while Nepali Congress won in ward numbers 2, 4 and 7 in the municipality.

Kathmandu valley outer ringroad will pass through this place.

Industries and Economy 
Korean Company
Gokarna Forest Resort
Kumari Bank
NIC Asia Bank
Kanti Bhairab Hume Pipe Pvt Ltd

Hindu temples 
Ganesh Temple, Nayagaun
Kolmateswor Temple, Simkhadagaun
RadhaKrishna Temple, Thali
Vimadevi Temple, Thali
Dumadevi Temple, Dumakhal
KANTI BHAIRAB TEMPLE, DANCHHI

Tourist attractions 
Bhimbadi Danda
Gokarna Forest Golf Resort http://gokarna.com/
Sahid Bann Batika
Firfire Danda
Simkhadagaun Pani Tanki
Danchhi Pani Tanki

References

External links
UML wins mayor and deputy of Kageswari Manohara Municipality
Govt gives final push for outer ring road project

Populated places in Kathmandu District